Vilaflor is a municipality and village in the south-central part of the island of Tenerife, one of the Canary Islands, and part of Santa Cruz de Tenerife (province), Spain. Vilaflor, with an altitude of 1,400 m, is the highest village on Tenerife, situated south of the Teide volcano. It is located 7 km north of San Miguel de Abona and 51 km southwest of the island's capital Santa Cruz de Tenerife. The population is 1,645 (2018) and the area is 56.26 km².

Sights

Paisaje Lunar, a geological curiosity created by erosion
El Piño Gordo pine tree.
The mineral springs of Fuente Alta, which can be found at 1400 meters above sea level in a protected nature reserve. The bottled water company Fuentealta derives from this mineral spring.
Sanctuary of the Santo Hermano Pedro, a church built in honor of Saint Peter of Saint Joseph Betancur (Santo Hermano Pedro).

History
The town of Vilaflor de Chasna was founded in the sixteenth century. Saint Peter of Saint Joseph Betancur was born in Vilaflor in 1626.

Climate

Historical population

Twin towns – sister cities

La Orotava, Spain
La Antigua Guatemala, Guatemala

Gallery

References

External links

 

Populated places established in the 16th century
Municipalities in Tenerife